Hoseynabad-e Ghafuri (also Romanized as Ḩoseynābād-e Ghafūrī; also known as Ḩoseynābād) is a village in Takab Rural District, Shahdad District, Kerman County, Kerman Province, Iran. At the 2006 census, its population was 44, in 11 families.

References 

Populated places in Kerman County